The Clock is a 1917 American silent comedy film directed by William Worthington and starring Franklyn Farnum, Agnes Vernon and Frank Whitson.

Cast
 Franklyn Farnum as Jack Tempest
 Agnes Vernon as Vivian Graham
 Frank Whitson as Bob Barrett
 Mark Fenton as John Graham
 Fred Montague as George Morgan 
 Willis Marks as Brandon
 Seymour Zeliff as Sam

References

Bibliography
 Robert B. Connelly. The Silents: Silent Feature Films, 1910-36, Volume 40, Issue 2. December Press, 1998.

External links
 

1917 films
1917 comedy films
1910s English-language films
American silent feature films
Silent American comedy films
American black-and-white films
Universal Pictures films
Films directed by William Worthington
1910s American films